Cuamba Solar Power Station (CSPS), is a  solar power plant under construction in Mozambique. The power station is under development by a consortium that comprises a British independent power producer and a Mauritian investor. A storage system consisting of lithium batteries with a capacity of 1.86 MVA/7.42 MW/h, will be incorporated in the design. The storage system will regulate the rate of delivery of the energy into the national grid and thereby stabilize the network. TSK Group, a Spanish engineering and construction conglomerate was awarded the engineering, procurement, and construction (EPC) contract in May 2021.

Location

Overview
The power station has a capacity of 20 megawatts, to be sold directly to the Electricidade de Moçambique (EDM), the state-owned electricity utility company, under a 25 year power purchase agreement. It is anticipated that the solar farm will enable the country forego the emissions of 630,000 tonnes of carbon dioxide (CO2) over the next 25 years, effective the date of commercial commissioning.

Developers
The power station is under development by a special purpose vehicle company, which we will describe as Cuamba Solar Company (CSC). CSC owns the power station. For the first five years of the life of the power station, TSK Group of Spain, the EPC contractor will operate and maintain the power station, before handing over to the owners. The table below illustrates the shareholding in the special purpose vehicle entity.

See also

List of power stations in Mozambique
Dondo Solar Power Station

References

External links
 Brief Project Profile at TSK Group Website	
 Globeleq plays the long game in Africa As of 11 February 2020.

Solar power stations in Mozambique
Niassa Province